Mayindou Karl Madianga (born 30 January 1994) is a French footballer who most recently played as a midfielder for Ekenäs IF.

Career
Madianga began his career in his hometown club Le Mans. On 5 February 2017, he joined Bulgarian club Lokomotiv Gorna Oryahovitsa.  He made his professional league debut on 2 April 2017 in a 5–0 home win against Vereya, coming on as substitute for Mohamed Ben Othman. Madianga didn't report back at the beginning of the 2017–18 season so the club has undertaken legal proceedings at FIFA.

Madianga signed for Scottish Premiership club Dundee in May 2018. He left the club on 31 January 2019.

After three years out of the senior game, Madianga returned to football with Finnish second tier side Ekenäs in January 2022, and would make 15 Ykkönen appearances in his season there.

International career
Born in France, Madianga is of Republic of the Congo descent. He is a youth international for France.

References

External links
 
 

1994 births
Living people
Footballers from Le Mans
Association football midfielders
French footballers
France youth international footballers
Le Mans FC players
AS Saint-Étienne players
FC Lokomotiv Gorna Oryahovitsa players
Dundee F.C. players
First Professional Football League (Bulgaria) players
Scottish Professional Football League players
French expatriate footballers
Expatriate footballers in Bulgaria
French expatriate sportspeople in Bulgaria
French sportspeople of Republic of the Congo descent
Expatriate footballers in Scotland
Black French sportspeople

French expatriate sportspeople in Finland
Ykkönen players
Ekenäs IF players